The 1999 Asian Basketball Confederation Championship for Women, was the 18th regional championship held by Asian Basketball Confederation. The competition was hosted by Shizuoka, Japan and took place between May 2 to May 9, 1999. The championship is divided into two levels: Level I and Level II. The last finisher of Level I is relegated to Level II and the top finisher of Level II qualify for Level I 2001's championship.

Participating teams

* Withdrew

Preliminary round

Level I

Level II

Final round

Semifinals

3rd place

Final

Final standing

Awards

References
 Results
 archive.fiba.com
 basketball-zine.com

1999
1999 in women's basketball
women
B
B